(born 1 October 1984 in Ibaraki, Japan) is a Japanese rugby union player. Taniguchi has played ten international matches for the Japan national rugby union team.

Taniguchi was a member of the Japan team at the 2011 Rugby World Cup where he played three matches for the Brave Blossoms.

Taniguchi currently plays for Top League team Kobelco Steelers.

References

Living people
1984 births
Japanese rugby union players
Japan international rugby union players
Kobelco Kobe Steelers players
Rugby union flankers
Rugby union number eights
Toyota Industries Shuttles Aichi players